Brampton Old Church stands about  to the west of the town of Brampton, Cumbria, England.  It was originally the parish church of Brampton but is now redundant.  The church is recorded in the National Heritage List for England as a designated Grade II* listed building.

History

The church building dates from the 12th century, with later alterations and additions. It formerly consisted of a tower, nave and chancel. The tower and nave were demolished between 1787 and 1789, although a porch was added in 1861. It was possibly re-roofed in 1891. It was replaced as the parish church in 1878 by St Martin's Church in the town of Brampton. The church was declared redundant in 1978 and the internal furnishings were removed.

Architecture

The church is constructed of red sandstone rubble, some of the stone having been obtained from Hadrian's Wall, with slate roofs.  It consists of the former chancel and the porch.  On the north side is the former sexton's lean-to shed.  The porch has iron gates and oak doors, and on its gable is a cross finial.  The chancel has a Norman window; the other windows date from 1891.  In the chancel is a piscina and aumbry dating possibly from the 12th century.  On its east gable is a cross finial and on the west gable is a bellcote.

See also

Grade II* listed buildings in the City of Carlisle
Listed buildings in Brampton, Carlisle

References

English churches with Norman architecture
Grade II* listed churches in Cumbria
Former Church of England church buildings
Church of England church buildings in Cumbria
Roman sites in Cumbria
Brampton, Carlisle
Roman auxiliary forts in England